NOAAS Oregon II (R 332) is an American fisheries research vessel in commission in the National Oceanic and Atmospheric Administration (NOAA) fleet since 1977. Prior to her NOAA career, she was delivered to the United States Fish and Wildlife Services Bureau of Commercial Fisheries in 1967 and was transferred to NOAA in 1970, but was not placed in commission until 1977.

Construction and commissioning 
Oregon II was built for the U.S. Fish and Wildlife Service at Ingalls Shipyard in Pascagoula, Mississippi. She was launched in February 1967 and delivered to the Fish and Wildlife Service's Bureau of Commercial Fisheries in August 1967, but was not commissioned. When NOAA was established on 3 October 1970, she became part of NOAA's fleet, and finally was commissioned on March 17, 1977, as NOAAS Oregon II (R 332).

Characteristics and capabilities 
Oregon II is outfitted as a double-rigged shrimp trawler, longliner, gillnetter, fish trap hauler, and dredger.

Oregon II has various laboratory capabilities. A 275-square-foot (25.5-square-meter) wet laboratory is situated aft on her main deck. She also has a 100-square-foot (9.3-square-meter) biology laboratory, a 75-square-foot (7-square-meter) computer laboratory, and a 210-square-foot (19.5-square-meter) hydrographic laboratory. She has a scientific freezer forward.

Oregon II carries an  rescue boat with a 90-horsepower (67-kW) motor and capable of carrying six people. Her crew includes a four-member dive team.

Oregon II has undergone an upgrade in which she received new electronic fish detection equipment, environmental sensors, and deck-handling and electronics equipment. Her laboratory and living spaces were refurbished, her original Fairbanks Morse main engines were replaced by new, more powerful Caterpillar engines, and a bow thruster was added to improve both her station-keeping and shiphandling capability.

Service history 

Operated by NOAAs Office of Marine and Aviation Operations, Oregon II conducts fishery and living marine resource studies in support of the research of the National Marine Fisheries Service (NMFS) Pascagoula Laboratory in Pascagoula. The ship collects fish and crustacean specimens using trawls and benthic longlines and fish larvae, fish eggs, and plankton using plankton nets and surface and midwater larval nets. She normally operates in the Gulf of Mexico, the Atlantic Ocean off the southeastern United States, and the Caribbean Sea. Her home port is Pascagoula.

Oregon IIs projects include summer and autumn groundfish surveys, summer shark longline surveys, and surveys of ichthyoplankton, marine mammals, and reef fish. She annually supports a striped bass survey and tagging effort by NMFSs Beaufort Laboratory in Beaufort, North Carolina.

On 16 March 1989, an engine fire broke out aboard Oregon II while she was moored at Mobile, Alabama. Her chief engineer, Mr. James V. Brosh, entered the smoke-filled engine room to make sure it was clear of personnel before discharging carbon dioxide into the area to fight the fire. He later personally directed Mobile Fire Department firefighters in extinguishing the blaze. His actions were credited with limiting the damage and saving the ship, and for his courage and heroism in ensuring the safety of personnel and in fighting the fire, he received the Department of Commerce Silver Medal later in 1989.

In August 1998, Oregon II became the first United States Government ship to call at Havana, Cuba, since Fidel Castro took control of the country in 1959. She visited Cuba to take part with NOAAs Cuban counterparts in a survey of sharks in Cuban waters to help determine shark migration patterns in the waters of the United States, Cuba, and Mexico. Her work in Cuba supplemented similar work done in Mexican waters.

The three people had been unable to send any distress signal, had been in the water for about five hours, were beginning to suffer hypothermia, and were in real danger of perishing during the upcoming night when Oregon II rescued them. Oregon II transferred them to a United States Coast Guard cutter, which returned them to shore. For vigilant watchstanding and promptly rescuing the three people, Oregon II received the Department of Commerce Gold Medal in 1999.

When NOAA retired the fisheries research ship NOAAS John N. Cobb (R 552) in August 2008, Oregon II became the oldest ship in the NOAA fleet. She achieved a milestone on 27 July 2012, when she departed Pascagoula on her 300th research cruise, an annual assessment of red snapper and shark populations in the Gulf of Mexico and western Atlantic Ocean.

Honors and awards
 Department of Commerce Gold Medal 1999

In a ceremony in 1999 in Washington, D.C., Oregon II was awarded the Department of Commerce Gold Medal for "public service or heroism" for her lifesaving efforts off Florida on 28 February 1999. The program for the ceremony cited her achievement as follows:

The NOAA Ship OREGON II is recognized for the rescue of two men and one woman whose 25-foot boat capsized in heavy weather off the Florida coast. By the time the OREGON II found them, the hapless mariners had been in the water for about five hours and had begun to suffer the debilitating effects of hypothermia. With darkness falling and the vessel drifting helplessly in the Gulf Stream and authorities unaware of their situation or their position, the three would almost surely have perished were it not for the vigilant watchstanding and prompt rescue efforts of the OREGON II.

See also
 NOAA ships and aircraft

References

External links 

Interviews with crew of the NOAA Ship Oregon II on YouTube

Ships of the National Oceanic and Atmospheric Administration
Ships of the United States Fish and Wildlife Service
Ships built in Pascagoula, Mississippi
1967 ships
Cuba–United States relations
Maritime incidents in 1989
Maritime incidents in 1999
Department of Commerce Gold Medal